Golden Grain is a compilation album by American record label Disturbing tha Peace. It was released on September 10, 2002 via Def Jam South.

It debuted on the US top 200 selling 95,000 in the first week. The album had only one single produced, the remix of Ludacris' song, "Growing Pains", from his Word of Mouf album. The single achieved limited airplay, reaching #61 on U.S. R&B.

Track listing

Charts

Weekly charts

Year-end charts

References

External links

Ludacris albums
2002 compilation albums
Disturbing tha Peace albums
Record label compilation albums
Def Jam Recordings compilation albums
Albums produced by Bangladesh (record producer)